Mihaela Loghin (born 1 June 1952) is a shot putter from Romania. She won a silver medal at the 1984 Olympics, one centimetre behind Claudia Losch, and a bronze medal at the  1986 European Indoor Championships.

After retiring from competitions in 1991, Loghin taught physical education, first at a school in Focsani and since 1992 at a military academy.

She has continued to compete in Masters athletics, setting the world record in the W60 division on 9 June 2012 at a meet in Bucharest.

References

External links 

 

1952 births
Athletes (track and field) at the 1984 Summer Olympics
Living people
Romanian female shot putters
Olympic athletes of Romania
Romanian masters athletes
Medalists at the 1984 Summer Olympics
Olympic silver medalists for Romania
Olympic silver medalists in athletics (track and field)
Universiade medalists in athletics (track and field)
Goodwill Games medalists in athletics
Universiade silver medalists for Romania
Universiade bronze medalists for Romania
Medalists at the 1975 Summer Universiade
Medalists at the 1979 Summer Universiade
Competitors at the 1986 Goodwill Games
People from Neamț County